Roupaki is a community in the municipal unit of Gastouni, Elis, Greece. It is situated in a flat, rural area, south of the river Pineios. It is 2 km southeast of Agia Mavra, 2 km west of Sosti, 2 km east of Koroivos, 6 km east of Gastouni and 8 km northwest of Amaliada.

Historical population

See also
List of settlements in Elis

References

External links
GTP - Roupaki

Populated places in Elis